Ronald Alfred Laskey  (born 26 January 1945) is a British cell biologist and cancer researcher.

Career and research
Laskey was the Charles Darwin Professor of Embryology at the University of Cambridge. In 1991, he co-founded the Wellcome Trust/Cancer Research Campaign Institute (now known as the Wellcome Trust/Cancer Research UK Gurdon Institute), along with five other senior scientists including Professor Sir John Gurdon. In 2001, he founded the Medical Research Council Cancer Cell Unit in 2001, and was Director of the Unit until 2010. Laskey is also a Fellow of Darwin College, Cambridge.

Awards and honours
Laskey was appointed Commander of the British Empire (CBE) in the 2011 New Year Honours. Other significant honours include the Royal Society Royal Medal, for his "pivotal contributions to our understanding of the control of DNA replication and nuclear protein transport, which has led to a novel screening method for cancer diagnosis", and the Cancer Research UK Lifetime Achievement Prize.

 1984: Elected Fellow of the Royal Society.
 1998: Louis-Jeantet Prize for Medicine.
 2000: Tomorrow's World award for health innovation.
 2001: Croonian Lecture.
 2009: Royal Society Royal Medal.
 2011: Received an CBE in the New Year Honours list for services to Science.
 2014: Cancer Research UK Lifetime Achievement In Cancer Research Prize

Personal life 

Laskey married Margaret Ann Page in 1971. Laskey is an author, composer and singer of (mostly) science-based humorous songs, in the tradition of Tom Lehrer. Various combinations of these songs were published by the Cold Cold Spring Harbor Laboratory Press in three records: "Songs for Cynical Scientists" (audio cassette), More Songs for Cynical Scientists and Selected Songs for Cynical Scientists (CDs).  Only the last-mentioned record is still available.

References

1945 births
Living people
People educated at the Royal Grammar School, High Wycombe
Alumni of The Queen's College, Oxford
Royal Medal winners
Fellows of the Royal Society
Fellows of the Academy of Medical Sciences (United Kingdom)
20th-century British biologists
21st-century British biologists
British medical researchers
Cancer researchers
Fellows of Darwin College, Cambridge
Commanders of the Order of the British Empire